The 1946 New Mexico gubernatorial election took place on November 5, 1946, in order to elect the Governor of New Mexico. Incumbent Democrat John J. Dempsey was term-limited, and could not run for reelection to a third consecutive term. Former lieutenant governor William Duckworth unsuccessfully sought the Republican nomination.

General election

Results

References

gubernatorial
1946
New Mexico
November 1946 events in the United States